Sheykh Mahalleh (also Romanized as Sheykh Maḩalleh) is a village in Hend Khaleh Rural District, Tulem District, Sowme'eh Sara County, Gilan Province, Iran. At the 2006 census, its population was 1,008, in 279 families.

References 

Populated places in Sowme'eh Sara County